Dipterocarpaceae is a family of 16 genera and about 695 known species of mainly tropical lowland rainforest trees. The family name, from the type genus Dipterocarpus, is derived from Greek (di = two, pteron = wing and karpos = fruit) and refers to the two-winged fruit. The largest genera are Shorea (196 species), Hopea (104 species), Dipterocarpus (70 species), and Vatica (65 species). Many are large forest-emergent species, typically reaching heights of 40–70 m, some even over 80 m (in the genera Dryobalanops, Hopea and Shorea), with the tallest known living specimen (Shorea faguetiana) 93.0 m tall. The species of this family are of major importance in the timber trade. Their distribution is pantropical, from northern South America to Africa, the Seychelles, India, Indochina, Indonesia, Malaysia and Philippines. The greatest diversity of Dipterocarpaceae occurs in Borneo. Some species are now endangered as a result of overcutting, extensive illegal logging, and habitat conversion. They provide valuable woods, aromatic essential oils, balsam, and resins, and are a source for plywood.

Classification
The dipterocarp family is generally divided into two subfamilies: 

 Dipterocarpoideae: the largest of the subfamilies, it contains 13 genera and about 475 species. Distribution includes the Seychelles, Sri Lanka, India, Southeast Asia to New Guinea, and a large distribution in Borneo, where they form the dominant species in the lowland forests. North Borneo (Brunei, Sabah, and Sarawak) is the richest area in the world for dipterocarp species. The Dipterocarpoideae can be divided morphologically into two groups, and the tribe names Shoreae and Dipterocarpeae are sometimes used, but genetic evidence so far does not support this division:
Valvate - Dipterocarpeae group (Anisoptera, Cotylelobium, Dipterocarpus, Stemonoporus, Upuna, Vateria, Vateriopsis, Vatica). The genera of this group have valvate sepals in fruit, solitary vessels, scattered resin canals, and basic chromosome number x = 11.
 Imbricate - Shoreae group (Balanocarpus, Hopea, Parashorea, Shorea). The genera of this group have imbricate sepals in fruit, grouped vessels, resin canals in tangential bands, and basic chromosome number x = 7. A recent molecular study suggests that the genus Hopea forms a clade with Shorea sections Anthoshorea and Doona, and should be merged into Shorea.
 Monotoideae: three genera, 30 species. Marquesia is native to Africa. Monotes has 26 species, distributed across Africa and Madagascar. Pseudomonotes is native to the Colombian Amazon.

A recent genetic study found that the Asian dipterocarps share a common ancestor with the Sarcolaenaceae, a tree family endemic to Madagascar. This suggests that ancestor of the dipterocarps originated in the southern supercontinent of Gondwana, and that the common ancestor of the Asian dipterocarps and the Sarcolaenaceae was found in the India-Madagascar-Seychelles land mass millions of years ago, and were carried northward by India, which later collided with Asia and allowed the dipterocarps to spread across Southeast Asia and Malaysia. The first dipterocarp pollen has been found in Myanmar (which at that time was part of the Indian plate) and it dates from the upper Oligocene. The sample appears to slowly increase in terms of diversity and abundance across the region into the mid-Miocene. Chemical traces of dipterocarp resins have been found dating back to the Eocene of India. The oldest fossil of the family are from the latest Cretaceous (Maastrichtian) aged Intertrappean Beds of India, assignable to the extant genus Dipterocarpus.

Subfamily Pakaraimoideae formerly placed here and native to the Guaianan highlands of South America, is now found to be more closely related the Cistaceae and is placed there in the APG IV (2016).

Fossilized arthropods
Some 52-million-year-old amber found in the Gujarat province, India, containing a large amount of fossilized arthropods, was identified as sap from the family Dipterocarpaceae.

Ecology

Dipterocarpaceae species can be either evergreen or deciduous. Species occurring in Thailand grow from sea level to about 1300 m elevation. Environments in which the species of the family occur in Thailand include lowland dipterocarp forest 0–350 m, riparian fringe, limestone hills, and coastal hills.

Conservation and climate change 
As the dominant tree in Southeast Asia, the Dipterocarp family has seen extensive study relating to its conservation status. They are a keystone species of the native forests of this region, and are essential to their function and structure. 

One study by Pang et al. examined the impacts of climate change and land cover on the distribution of this important tree family in the Philippines. They used species distribution models (SDMs) for 19 species that were projected onto both current and future climate scenarios, with current land cover incorporated as well. They found that the current land cover alone reduced the species distributions by 67%, and 37% in protected areas. On the other hand, climate change reduced species distributions by 16-27% in both protected and unprotected areas. There was also an upward shift in elevation of species distribution as a result of climate change, as habitats changed. They concluded that there was a need to improve protected area planning as refuges for critical species, with SDMs proving to be a useful tool for providing projections that can then be incorporated into this planning process.

Another paper by Shishir et al. also investigated the potential effects of climate change on a threatened Dipterocarp tree in Purbachal, Bangladesh. Using a model that incorporated nine different environmental variables such as climate, geography, and soil conditions, they looked at two climate scenarios. They found that precipitation and soil nitrogen were the largest determinants of distribution, and that suitable habitat for this species will decline by 21-28% relative to the present land area as a result of climate change.

See also
Dipterocarp timber classification

References

External links

 
 Dipterocarpaceae Data Base 

 
Malvales families
Pantropical flora